Bank Robber is a 1993 American crime film written and directed by Nick Mead in his directorial debut.

Plot

Billy (Dempsey), is a well dressed bank robber who decides to do one last heist so he can sail off to a tropical island with his girlfriend, Selina (d'Abo). On his last robbery, he forgets to destroy a surveillance camera. He then must hide out in the Heartbreak Hotel until he can get out of trouble.

Cast

Critical reception
Stephen Holden of The New York Times gave it a mixed to negative review:

References

External links
 
 
 

1993 films
1990s English-language films
1993 crime films
Films scored by Stewart Copeland
1993 directorial debut films
American crime films
1990s American films